Hibberdene is a small coastal town on the KwaZulu-Natal South Coast in South Africa. It was named after C. Maxwell-Hibberd, the former postmaster-general of Natal.

Hibberdene is located in the Hibiscus Coast region of the KZN South Coast and is a seaside town situated 97 km south of Durban, halfway between Scottburgh and Margate. Hibberdene has become a popular holiday destination with local and foreign tourists. It is known as an affordable destination and for its beaches. Hibberdene has five popular beaches, four of which are netted and thus are safe for swimming. Hibberdene's beaches are popular because of the warm Indian Ocean flowing across its shoreline, making diving, snorkelling and scuba diving very pleasant.

Hibberdene serves as a shopping centre for the small settlements and countryside surrounding it. A twice daily shuttle bus stops in Hibberdene connecting the town with Margate, Port Shepstone, Durban and King Shaka International Airport.

Geography 
Hibberdene lies on a gentle slope overlooking the Indian Ocean coastline between the Mhlungwa River to the north and Mzimayi River to the south. The town is located approximately 23 km north-east of Port Shepstone and 90 km south-west of Durban and is bordered by Mthwalume to the north and its extension of Woodgrange-on-sea to the south.

The Greater Hibberdene area includes 5 suburbs with some being formally independent communities (e.g. Umzumbe). The greater area consists of Hibberdene proper (the main town) which is north of the Mzimayi River, Catalina which is north of Hibberdene and Woodgrange-on-sea (also known as just 'Woodgrange') which is south of the Mzimayi River. Further south of Woodgrange, to the south of the uMzumbe River is the seaside village of Umzumbe and the rural areas of Fairview and Fairview Mission further inland of Umzumbe.

Economy 
Hibberdene's Central Business District (CBD) is typical of the small towns located along the South Coast, stringing along the main road, 'Marlin Drive'.

Retail 
Hibberdene only has two shopping centres which has Hibberdene Village Mall in the CBD with Superspar as its anchor tenant ans a small Pick n Pay. The remainder of Hibberdene's retail sector is purely based on the string of retail stores and services in the CBD. Hibberdene's leading Architectural Technologists are Ngileni.

Culture and comptemptory life

Tourism 
Similarly to most towns along the South Coast, Hibberdene mostly depends on tourism for its small-scale economy. Hibberdene is known to be one of the most affordable seaside holiday destinations not just on the South Coast but in South Africa as a whole and consists of several holiday homes, guesthouses and B&Bs on the coastline or with a view of the Indian Ocean.

Furthermore, within the Greater Hibberdene area there are two beaches, Hibberdene Beach and Umzumbe Beach, both of which are protected and are accredited with the international Blue Flag beach status.

Transport 
Hibberdene's thoroughfare is the R102 which is the original N2 and served the same function before the construction of the highway. The R102 runs through the CBD of Hibberdene and links the town to Umzumbe and Port Shepstone in the south-west and Pennington and Scottburgh in the north-east. The R102 can be used an alternative route to Port Shepstone for motorists avoiding the tolled N2 highway.

The N2 South Coast Toll Route a tolled national highway that bypasses Hibberdene to the west and links the town to Scottburgh and Durban in the north-east and Port Shepstone in the south-west. Access to the N2 from Hibberdene can be obtained through the R102 interchange (Exit 72).

References

Populated places in the Ray Nkonyeni Local Municipality
Populated coastal places in South Africa
KwaZulu-Natal South Coast